Danusika Bandara (born Gamaralalage Danusika Bandara on 4 September 1986) is a Sri Lankan first-class cricketer. He is a right-handed batsman and right arm leg break bowler who has played for Sri Lanka Army Sports Club (SLASC) and Panadura Sports Club. He was born in Akurana.

Bandara, who had played for SLASC Under-23s during the 2008 season, made his first-class debut for the club's first team in the 2007–08 Premier Trophy on 9 January 2009. He made his List A debut for SLASC in the 2015–16 Premier Limited Overs Tournament on 2 December 2015.

Bandara had a season with Panadura SC in 2017–18 and then returned to SLASC for 2018–19, which was his last season to date. He has played in 21 first-class and eight List A matches.

References

External links
 

1986 births
Living people
Sri Lankan cricketers
Sri Lanka Army Sports Club cricketers